was a constituency of the House of Councillors in the Diet of Japan (national legislature). It consists of Tokushima Prefecture and elects two Councillors, one every three years by a first-past-the-post system for a six-year term. In the first election in 1947, Tokushima like all districts used single non-transferable vote to elect both its Councillors in one election.

Single-member districts (ichinin-ku) for the House of Councillors often play a decisive role for the outcome of elections as little swing in votes is required to achieve a change of the Councillors elected there. Tokushima in predominantly rural Shikoku has for decades voted for candidates from the Liberal Democratic Party (LDP) or ex-LDP conservative independents by large margins. In the landslide election of 1989 that left the LDP-led government without a majority in the House of Councillors for the first time, a so-called "twisted parliament" (nejire kokkai), Harumi Inui from RENGO trade union federation's Rengō no Kai won Tokushima against incumbent Tomoyoshi Kamanaga by a margin of 60,000 votes.

With its 641,534 registered voters (as of September 2015), it is the fourth-smallest electoral district for the house. To address the imbalance in representation between districts, a 2015 revision of the Public Officers Election Law will see the district merged with the Kochi At-large district to create the Tokushima-Kochi At-large district; this change will begin to take effect at the 2016 election, at which one Councillor will be elected.

The current Councillors for Tokushima are:
Yusuke Nakanishi (LDP, term expires 2016)
Toru Miki (LDP, term expires 2019)

Elected Councillors

References 
 House of Councillors: Alphabetical list of former Councillors

Districts of the House of Councillors (Japan)